Fowlea unicolor is a species of snake in the family Colubridae. As currently known, it is endemic to Sri Lanka, although it might also occur in southern India.

References 

Fowlea
Snakes of Asia
Reptiles of Sri Lanka
Endemic fauna of Sri Lanka
Reptiles described in 1887
Taxa named by Fritz Müller (doctor)